This list of television awards for Best Actress is an index to articles that describe "Best Actress" awards for television performances. It includes general awards and awards for performance is a drama series, mini-series or television movie, and musical or comedy.

General

Drama series

Miniseries or Television Movie

Musical or Comedy

See also

 Best Actress
 Lists of awards
 Lists of acting awards
 List of awards for actresses
 List of television acting awards

References

 
Television, best actress